Konovalov is a rural locality (a khutor) in Tsarevskoye Rural Settlement, Leninsky District, Volgograd Oblast, Russia. The population was 7 as of 2010.

Geography 
Konovalov is located 30 km southeast of Leninsk (the district's administrative centre) by road. Tsaryov is the nearest rural locality.

References 

Rural localities in Leninsky District, Volgograd Oblast